Cerise (French for "cherry") was a French military reconnaissance satellite. Its main purpose was to intercept HF radio signals for French intelligence services. With a mass of 50 kg, it was launched by an Ariane rocket from Kourou in French Guiana at 17:23 UT, 7 July 1995. Cerise's initial orbital parameters were period 98.1 min, apogee 675 km, perigee 666 km, and inclination 98.0 deg.

On 24 July 1996 it was hit by a catalogued space debris object from an Ariane rocket, making it the first verified case of an accidental collision between two artificial objects in space.

The collision (with relative velocity of 14.8 km/s) tore off a 2.8-2.9 metre (9.2-9.5 foot) portion of Cerise's gravity-gradient stabilization boom, which left the satellite severely damaged and tumbling with a limited attitude control system. Novel magnetic control algorithms were used to re-stabilise the otherwise undamaged microsatellite to regain almost full operational mission capability.

See also

 1995 in spaceflight

References

External links
NSSDC Master Catalog - Cerise
National geographic image of the collision

Derelict satellites orbiting Earth
Satellites of France
Spacecraft launched in 1995
Spacecraft launched by Ariane rockets
Military equipment introduced in the 1990s